Tommaso Tommasina (Novara, Piedmont, November 26, 1855 - 1935) was an Italian painter and sculptor.

He was resident in Rome and later in Suna on the shores of Lago Maggiore. After 1886, he moved to Geneva. He painted portraits and watercolors. At Turin, in 1880 and 1884, he exhibited portrait of a woman. He also completed the following watercolors: Quel che avvenne poi and Mater dolorosa, and a bronzed stucco bust, titled: Civis romanus sum!

References

1855 births
1935 deaths
19th-century Italian painters
Italian male painters
20th-century Italian painters
Painters from Milan
19th-century Italian male artists
20th-century Italian male artists